The Ministry of National Security, formerly Ministry of Internal Security and Ministry of Public Security, is a government agency of Israel.

It is the statewide law enforcement agency and oversees the Israel Police, the Israel Prison Service and the Israel National Fire and Rescue Services, Israel Border Police, National Headquarters for the Protection of Children on the Internet, National Authority for Community Safety and The Authority for Witness Protection.

The current Minister of National Security is Itamar Ben-Gvir.

List of ministers
The Minister of National Security (Sar LeVitahon Leumi) is the political head of the ministry.

Until 1995 the position was known as Minister of Police (Sar HaMishtara). The first Minister of Police, Bechor-Shalom Sheetrit, was a former policeman, and served in the position from Israeli independence in May 1948 until a month before his death in January 1967, serving in fourteen governments and making him the country's longest continually serving minister. The post was abolished after Menachem Begin became Prime Minister in 1977, but was reinstated in 1984 when Shimon Peres became PM. There is occasionally a Deputy Minister of Public Security. In December 2022, the position was renamed again from The Minister of Public Security (Sar LeVitahon Pnim) to the Minister of National Security.

Deputy ministers

Agencies
 Israel Police
 Border Guard
 Civil Guard
 Firearm Licensing Department
 Former Israel Anti-Drug & Alcohol Authority (Now called The National Authority for Community Safety)
 Israel Witness Protection Authority
 The Authority for Witness Protection
 Urban enforcement system - urban policing
 The National Headquarters for the Protection of Children on the Internet
 National Guard
 Israel Fire and Rescue Services (transferred from Ministry of Interior in 2011)
 Israel Prison Service
 Police & Prison Service Personnel Ombudsman
 City Without Violence
 Metzila Community and Crime Prevention Division

References

External links

Official website 
Official website 
Official website 
Official website 
All Ministers in the Ministry of Police (Internal Security) Knesset website

Public Security
Ministry of Public Security
Public Security
 
Law enforcement in Israel
Public safety ministries
1948 establishments in Israel